Night Train is a Canberra-based rock band, previously called Juggernaut 101.

Band members

Current members
 Clint Bopping – vocals, bass (?–present)
 Scotty Masters – guitar (?–present)
 David Moon – guitar, backing vocals (?–present)
 Ben Schumann – drums (1981–present)

Former members
 David Bishop – vocals
 Dave Price – drums
 Andrew Ewart – bass
 Leigh Miller – bass
 Aaron Beutel

Discography

Albums
As Juggernaut 101
Red Headed Step Child (2001)

Extended plays

Singles
"Black Sally Lane" (2005)
"Be There" (2006)
"One More Night" (2010)

References

Australian Capital Territory musical groups